Paralepis is a genus of barracudinas.

Species
There are currently four recognized species in this genus:
 Paralepis brevirostris (A. E. Parr, 1928)
 Paralepis coregonoides A. Risso, 1820 (Sharpchin barracudina)
 Paralepis elongata (A. B. Brauer, 1906)
 Paralepis speciosa Bellotti, 1878

References

Paralepididae
Taxa named by Georges Cuvier
Ray-finned fish genera